Jean Peltier may refer to:
 Jean Charles Athanase Peltier, French physicist
 Jean Raymond Peltier, French rower